Nabb or NABB may refer to:

Nabb, Indiana, an unincorporated community in the United States
Nationwide Association of Blood Bikes

People with the surname
Carl-Gustaf Nabb (born 1936), Finnish footballer
Magdalen Nabb (1947–2007), British author